Qing Lian Zhan Shi (literally "The Incorruptible Warrior") is a Chinese video game. The player takes on the role of protagonist who battles corrupt government officials as well as their children and mistresses. The game received financial sponsoring from the Chinese Communist Party Disciplinary Committee of the Haishu district in Ningbo city.

Just weeks after its launch, the game attracted so many users that its servers crashed and it had to be taken offline for upgrades.

References

External links
The Incorruptible Warrior - English translation of a Southern Metro Daily article on the game

2007 video games
Chinese-language-only video games
Government simulation video games
Propaganda video games
Video games developed in China
Windows games
Windows-only games